Frederick "Fred" Harrison (birth unknown – death unknown) was an English professional rugby league footballer who played in the 1910s. He played at representative level for Great Britain and England, and at club level for Leeds, as a forward (prior to the specialist positions of), during the era of contested scrums.

Playing career

International honours
Fred Harrison won caps for England while at Leeds in 1911 against Australia, in 1912 against Wales, in 1913 against Wales, and won caps for Great Britain while at Leeds in 1911 against Australia (2 matches), and in 1912 against Australia.

Challenge Cup Final appearances
Frank Harrison played as a forward, i.e. number 10, in Leeds' 7-7 draw with Hull F.C. in the 1910 Challenge Cup Final during the 1909–10 season at Fartown Ground, Huddersfield on Saturday 16 April 1910, in front of a crowd of 19,413, this was the first Challenge Cup Final to be drawn, and played as a forward, i.e. number 9, in the 26-12 victory over Hull F.C. in the 1910 Challenge Cup Final replay during the 1909–10 season at Fartown Ground, Huddersfield on Monday 18 April 1910, in front of a crowd of 11,608, this was Leeds' first Challenge Cup Final win in their first appearance.

References

External links

England national rugby league team players
English rugby league players
Great Britain national rugby league team players
Leeds Rhinos players
Place of birth missing
Place of death missing
Rugby league forwards
Year of birth missing
Year of death missing